Canthigaster supramacula, known as the West African sharpnose-puffer, is a species of marine fish in the family Tetraodontidae. It was first isolated from the coast of central Africa, in the Atlantic Ocean. It is named in reference to the conspicuous ocellus-like spot on its side, anterior to its dorsal fin's base.

Description
It shows a conspicuous dark spot resembling an ocellus on the dorsal portion of its trunk, the dorsal portion of which extends towards its dorsal fin. It lacks dark stripes along the sides of the body like some of its cogenerate species, bearing two to four lines that extend from the caudal peduncle through the dorsal fin's base .

Distribution
The species is reef-associated. It is known from the Eastern Central Atlantic, first collected from off Côte d'Ivoire and Ghana.

References

Further reading
Wirtz, Peter, et al. "Coastal fishes of São Tomé and Príncipe islands, Gulf of Guinea (Eastern Atlantic Ocean)–an update." Zootaxa 1523 (2007): 1-48.
Randall, John E., Jeffrey T. Williams, and Luiz A. Rocha. "The Indo-Pacific tetraodontid fish Canthigaster coronata, a complex of three species." Smithiana Bulletin 9 (2008): 3-13.
Quimbayo Agreda, Juan Pablo. "Estruturas das comunidades de peixes recifais em ilhas oceânicas do atlântico e pacífico oriental." (2013).
Wirtz, Peter, et al. "The coastal fishes of the Cape Verde Islands–new records and an annotated check-list." Spixiana 36.1 (2013): 113–142.

External links
FishBase

supramacula
Taxa named by Rodrigo Leão de Moura
Taxa named by Ricardo Macedo Corrêa e Castro
Fish described in 2002